"Crawl Space" is the eleventh episode of the fourth season of the American television crime drama series Breaking Bad, and the 44th overall episode of the series. It originally aired on AMC in the United States on September 25, 2011. The episode introduces Barry Goodman, played by JB Blanc.

Plot 
Making their escape after killing off Don Eladio Vuente and the Cartel's leadership, Jesse Pinkman drives Gus Fring, who is weakened due to taking his own poison, and Mike Ehrmantraut, who is wounded, to a makeshift emergency room that Gus earlier prepared. Gus recovers quickly, but Mike has to stay another week before he can safely travel, so he is left behind in Mexico. Jesse is told that he will take over cooking meth for Walter White, but Jesse insists that Walter must not be harmed. Gus later takes Jesse with him to visit Hector Salamanca, who is using a wheelchair and living in a nursing home. Hector is in the nursing home's day room, watching the climactic scene of The Bridge on the River Kwai. Gus taunts him as the Salamanca lineage has now been destroyed, and shows him Jesse, explaining that Jesse killed Hector's last living descendant, Joaquin. 

Later, Hank requests Walter to drive him to the Pollos Hermanos chicken farm that Hank has been planning to investigate, but along the way reveals that he also wants to investigate an industrial laundry owned by the same parent company as Pollos Hermanos—the same laundry that Walt works at. In a panic, Walt deliberately crashes his car, forcing Hank to stop using Walt as his chauffeur.

Meanwhile, Ted appears to blackmail Skyler White about the $617,000 required for paying off the IRS, as Skyler infers that Ted wants more money than she has already given him. Skyler enlists Saul Goodman's men, Huell and Kuby, to extort Ted into paying the IRS. Ted gives in, signing the cheque, but then attempts to escape; he trips, hits his head, and knocks himself out.

Walter realizes that Jesse has also been cooking in the lab. Walter pleads for them to stick together to thwart Gus, but Jesse, still bitter after their fight, turns his back on Walter. Walt is then abducted and taken out to the desert where Gus fires him and demands he never return to the laundry or speak with Jesse again, and says that his crew will murder Hank due to the risk of Hank's investigations. When Walt protests, Gus threatens to murder Walt's entire family should Walt continue to interfere.

Panicked, Walter barges into Saul's office and takes Saul up on an earlier offer to be vanished. Saul tells him this will cost Walt and his family half a million dollars. Walter accepts and also asks Saul to place an anonymous tip to the DEA warning of a threat to Hank and his family, to which Saul reluctantly agrees. Walter rushes to the family house to get the money stored in the crawl space but finds that it is insufficient. Skyler walks in on Walt, and, when Walt asks about the missing money, discloses that she gave the money to Ted to pay off the IRS. Walt screams in agony, before breaking down laughing as a frightened Skyler backs away. Marie Schrader, crying, calls to say that the DEA has received an anonymous tip that Hank is a target again, and the DEA is sending many agents to guard him as Walt continues laughing hysterically.

Analysis 
Sean Hutchinson of Inverse analyzed the final shot of "Crawl Space", in which the camera pans upwards from Walter laughing in the crawl space. Pulsating music ends with a feedback screech and cut to black. The shot's framing mirrors that of Walter's later death in the Breaking Bad finale "Felina". Hutchinson viewed it as black comedy, saying that Walter is realizing that he is not in control of the situation. Hutchinson saw the storyline as part of the "open-ended action" that often led to characters appearing to have no way to resolve the situation, but finding a plausible way to do so.

Reception 
Bryan Cranston submitted this episode for consideration for the Primetime Emmy Award for Outstanding Lead Actor in a Drama Series for the 64th Primetime Emmy Awards.

Critical reception 
The episode received laudatory reviews from television critics and has been cited by many as one of the best in the series. Noel Murray of The A.V. Club awarded the episode an "A", describing it as "intense and terrifying". Seth Amitin of IGN awarded the episode 9 out of 10, praising Cranston's performance as "an amazing piece of acting" and describing the episode as "shocking and eye-brow-raising and fascinating".

Hutchinson praised the final shot and the storylines leading up to it, calling it Breaking Bads "most underrated moment" and "a perfect bit of mise en scene". In 2019, The Ringer ranked "Crawl Space" as the 9th best of the 62 Breaking Bad episodes.

Notes

References

External links 
 "Crawl Space" at the official Breaking Bad site
 

2011 American television episodes
Breaking Bad (season 4) episodes